Letya Zeya Thingyan was governor of Toungoo (Taungoo) from 1408/09 to 1411/12. Born Khin Nyo, he was a childhood tutor of King Minkhaung I of Ava. His appointment as governor of Toungoo came at the height of the Forty Years' War against the Hanthawaddy Kingdom, and he commanded the regional Toungoo army, which consisted of 60 war elephants. In 1411/12, Minkhaung reappointed Letya to Pyinzi because the king was concerned that Letya was getting too old to be governor of a frontier town during the war. He lost his post in 1426 when the new king Mohnyin Thado appointed his son-in-law Thihapate governor of Pyinzi.

References

Bibliography
 
 

Ava dynasty